Jezierzany may refer to the following places:
Jezierzany, Lower Silesian Voivodeship (south-west Poland)
Jezierzany, West Pomeranian Voivodeship (north-west Poland)
 Jezierzany, a town in the former province of Galicia, which ran along the southern border of Poland. It has an historical connection to the Austro-Hungarian Empire. Today, it is a populated place called Ozeriany, in Chortkiv Raion (district), Ternopil Oblast (province), Ukraine.

Alternate spellings 
 Yezerzhany
 Yezezhany
 Yeziverzany

See also
Ozeryany